The Bishop of Penrith is an episcopal title which takes its name after the town of Penrith in Cumbria.

The title was first mentioned (as Pereth) in the Suffragan Bishops Act 1534 (alongside a see for Penreth – now called Penrydd – in Pembrokeshire) and was first used for the Diocese of Ripon in 1888, but the incumbent had his episcopal title transferred to Richmond by Royal Warrant in 1889. Since 1939, the Bishop of Penrith is a suffragan bishop in the Church of England Diocese of Carlisle who assists the diocesan Bishop of Carlisle in overseeing the diocese.

List of bishops

References
 D.H.Marston: "The Bishopric of Barrow-in-Furness" (2nd Edition, 2017)

External links
 Crockford's Clerical Directory - Listings

Bishops of Penrith
Anglican suffragan bishops in the Diocese of Carlisle